José Luis Rodríguez may refer to:

José Luis Rodríguez Vélez (1915–1984), Panamanian musician
José Luis Rodríguez (singer) (born 1943), El Puma, Venezuelan singer and actor
José Luis Rodríguez Zapatero (born 1960), former Prime Minister of Spain (2004–2011)
José Luis Rodríguez (footballer, born 1963), El Puma, former Argentine football striker
José Luis Loreto (José Luis Rodríguez Loreto, born 1971), former Spanish football striker
José Luis Rodríguez Pittí (born 1971), Panamanian writer, documentary photographer, and computer systems engineer
José Luis Rodríguez Aguilar (born 1994), Chilean cyclist
José Luis Rodríguez (footballer, born 1997), Uruguayan footballer
José Luis Rodríguez (footballer, born 1998), Panamanian footballer
José Luis Rodríguez Jiménez (born 1961), Spanish historian

See also
Jose Rodríguez (disambiguation)
Luis Rodriguez (disambiguation)